Albert Torres may refer to:

Albert Torres (salsa promoter) (1956–2017), American Salsa promoter
Albert Torres (cyclist) (born 1990), Spanish cyclist
Albert Torres (screenwriter), writer of the film Henry Poole Is Here